The North Cork Junior A Football Championship (known for sponsorship reasons as the Synergy Fermoy Credit Union Junior Football Championship) is an annual Gaelic football competition organised by the Avondhu Board of the Gaelic Athletic Association since 1926 for junior Gaelic football teams in the northern part of Cork.

The series of games begin in April, with the championship culminating with the final in the autumn. The championship includes a knock-out stage and a "back door" for teams defeated in the first round.

The North Cork Junior Championship is an integral part of the wider Cork Junior Football Championship. The winners and runners-up of the North Cork championship join their counterparts from the other seven divisions to contest the county championship.

10 clubs currently participate in the North Cork Championship. The title has been won at least once by 17 different clubs. The all-time record-holders are Mitchelstown, who have won a total of 24 titles.

Buttevant are the 2022 title-holders defeating Charleville by 1-09 to 1-08.

Format

Group stage 
The 10 teams are divided into two groups of three and one group of four. Over the course of the group stage, each team plays once against the others in the group, resulting in each team being guaranteed at least three games. Two points are awarded for a win, one for a draw and zero for a loss. The teams are ranked in the group stage table by points gained, then scoring difference and then their head-to-head record. The top two teams in each group qualify for the knockout stage.

Knockout stage 
Quarter-finals: Two lone quarter-finals featuring the four lowest-placed qualifying teams from the group stage. Two teams qualify for the next round.

Semi-finals: The two quarter-final winners and the top two highest-placed qualifying teams from the group stage contest this round. The two winners from these games advance to the final.

Final: The two semi-final winners contest the final. The winning team are declared champions.

Promotion and relegation 
At the end of the championship, the winning team enters the Cork Junior A Football Championship and by winning this, they will be promoted to the Cork Premier Junior Football Championship for the following season. There is no relegation to the North Cork Junior B Football Championship.

Teams

2023 teams

Roll of honour

List of finals

Notes:
 2021 - The game ended in a draw and extra time was played.

2022 Championship

Group stage
Group A

Group B

Group C

Knockout stage

Records

By decade

The most successful team of each decade, judged by number of North Cork Junior Football Championship titles, is as follows:
 1920s: 1 each for Fermoy (1926), Newmarket (1927), Mitchelstown (1928) and Mallow (1929)
 1930s: 4 for Mitchelstown (1934-35-37-39)
 1940s: 5 for Mitchelstown (1940-43-44-47-48)
 1950s: 5 for Mitchelstown (1951-55-56-57-58)
 1960s: 3 each for Mitchelstown (1960-61-69) and Kilshannig (1965-67-68)
 1970s: 3 each for Grange (1970-77-79) and Mitchelstown (1972-73-75)
 1980s: 5 for Clyda Rovers (1980-86-87-88-89)
 1990s: 2 each for Kildorrery (1990-94), Fermoy (1993-97) and Killavullen (1998-99)
 2000s: 3 for Glanworth (2006-08-09)
 2010s: 3 each for Mitchelstown (2010-11-13) and Ballyclough (2012-15-16)

Gaps

Top ten longest gaps between successive championship titles:
 51 years: Mallow (1933-1984)
 35 years: Glanworth (1971-2006)
 33 years: Fermoy (1941-1974)
 20 years: Mitchelstown (1975-1995)
 19 years: Fermoy (1974-1993)
 18 years: Kilshannig (1996-2014)
 13 years: Kildorrery (1994-2007)
 12 years: Kilshannig (1978-1990)
 10 years: Fermoy (1926-1936)
 10 years: Deel Rovers (1981-1991)

See also

North Cork Junior A Hurling Championship

References

External links
 Avondhu GAA website

North Cork Junior A Football Championship